The Chazen Museum of Art is an art museum located at the University of Wisconsin–Madison in Madison, Wisconsin. The Chazen Museum of Art is accredited by the American Alliance of Museums.

History
Until 2005, the Museum was known regularly as the Elvehjem Museum of Art, named after Conrad Elvehjem, the 13th president of the University of Wisconsin-Madison and an internationally known biochemist in nutrition.
 In May 2005, the museum was renamed the Chazen Museum of Art after a $20 million building-expansion donation from alumni Simona and Jerome A. Chazen, the latter being a founder of Liz Claiborne Inc. (now known as Kate Spade & Company). The original museum building, which opened in 1970, retains the Elvehjem name.

In 2015, the Chazens again made a substantial donation to the museum that included $5 million dedicated to the museum building, $3 million to endow chairs in art and art history at the University of Wisconsin, and 30 works of art valued at $20 million.

After three decades as the museum's director, Russell Panczenko stepped down in 2017 and was replaced by new director Amy Gilman who is still working today.

In 2018, the Association of Art Museum Directors announced a pilot program that would provide paid internships to minority undergraduate students wanting to work in the arts, with the Chazen Museum of Art being one of the inaugural participants in the program.

In 2019, the museum hosted a photo exhibit entitled Southern Rites by photographer, filmmaker and University of Wisconsin alumnus Gillian Laub.

An exhibit featuring the sculpture of Petah Coyne was also on display at the museum in 2021.

Collections
European artists represented in the museum include Joan Miró, Auguste Rodin, Salvador Dalí, Barnaba da Modena, Barbara Hepworth, Jean Dufy, Andrea Vanni, Giorgio Vasari, René Magritte, Maurice Utrillo, Hubert Robert, Thomas Gainsborough, Albert Gleizes, Henry Moore, Benjamin Williams Leader, Eugène Boudin, and Maximilien Luce. The museum's collection of American artists includes Mark Rothko, Andy Warhol, Grandma Moses, many of Alexander Calder's works in several forms, and a copy of the Emancipation Memorial. Contemporary works by Shusaku Arakawa, David Klamen, Karen LaMonte, a collection of regionalist paintings by John Steuart Curry, Russian Social Realist paintings by Georgy Ionin and Klavdy Vasiliyevich Lebedev, glass art by René Lalique, and a representation of Japanese woodblock prints are also exhibited. The Van Vleck collection of Japanese woodblock prints remains a large portion of the museum's collection of works on paper.

Chamber concerts known as Sunday Afternoon Live from the Chazen (formerly Live at the Elvehjem) were broadcast from the museum by Wisconsin Public Radio until 2015 when WPR discontinued the program. The concert series continues on a monthly schedule as a live show with a webcast.

The Chazen Museum of Art is the official repository of Tandem Press, Madison, Wisconsin, a fine arts publisher. It archives one print from every edition that is published.

References

External links 

Sunday Afternoon from the Chazen

University museums in Wisconsin
Art museums and galleries in Wisconsin
University of Wisconsin–Madison
Museums in Madison, Wisconsin
Institutions accredited by the American Alliance of Museums
National Register of Historic Places in Madison, Wisconsin
Historic district contributing properties in Wisconsin
University and college buildings on the National Register of Historic Places in Wisconsin
1969 establishments in Wisconsin
Art museums established in 1969